Battery was an American electro-industrial trio based in San Francisco. It consisted of vocalist Maria Azevedo and musicians Evan Sornstein and Shawn Brice. They released four albums on COP International between 1993 and 1998 before disbanding.

History 
Battery was formed at Bennington College, Vermont, in 1989 by Shawn Brice, Stuart Scanlon and Evan Sornstein, beginning in an electronic music project for class. In 1991, the trio relocated to San Francisco, where they were adopted by COP Intl. In 1992, Stuart moved back to the East Coast, and Battery recruited vocalist Maria Azevedo who had stood in during a live show.

COP International issued the band's debut album Mutate in 1993. Their second album nv released in 1995. It was followed by Distance a year later, which was a culmination of four months in the studio. Their fourth and final album Aftermath was released in 1998. Amy Hanson of AllMusic described the album as "a highlight" and a "testament to their creative drive." The band dissolved in 2000, with its band members pursuing separate projects.

Discography 
Studio albums
Mutate (1993, COP Intl.)
nv (1995, COP Intl.) – #23 CMJ RPM Charts
Distance (1996, COP Intl.)
Aftermath (1998, COP Intl.) – #14 CMJ RPM Charts

Extended plays
 Eternal Darkness (1991, COP Intl.)
 Meat Market (1992, COP Intl.)
 Lilith 3.2 (1994, COP Intl.)
 Momentum (1998, COP Intl.) – #15 CMJ RPM Charts
 Debris (1999)

References

External links 

Musical groups established in 1989
Musical groups disestablished in 2000
1989 establishments in Vermont
Musical groups from Vermont
Musical groups from San Francisco
Electro-industrial music groups
COP International artists
American electronic music groups